Henry Barbour (fl. 1384–1391), of Reading, Berkshire, was an English politician.

He was a Member (MP) of the Parliament of England for Reading in November 1384 and 1391.

References

Year of birth missing
Year of death missing
English MPs November 1384
English MPs 1391
14th-century English politicians
People from Reading, Berkshire